Donnell is both a surname and a given name. Notable people with the name include:

Surname 

Ben Donnell (American football) (1936–2012), American football player
Bobby Donnell, fictional head of a law firm on the former ABC TV drama, The Practice (1997–2004)
David Donnell (born 1939), Canadian poet and writer
Deborah Donnell, New Zealand and American statistician
Forrest C. Donnell (1884–1980), United States Senator and the 40th Governor of Missouri
Harry E. Donnell (1867–1959), American Beaux-Arts architect
Hugh O Donnell, 2nd Earl of Tyrconnell or Hugh O'Donnell, 2nd Earl of Tyrconnell (1606–1642), titular King of Tír Conaill
Hugh Roe Ó Donnell or Hugh Roe O'Donnell (1572–1602), An Ó Domhnaill (The O'Donnell) and Rí (king) of Dun na nGall
James C. Donnell (1854–1927), American industrialist
Jeff Donnell (1921–1988), American film and television actress
John Donnell Smith (1829–1928), biologist and taxonomist from Baltimore, Maryland
John Randolph Donnell (1912–2004), oilman, banker and philanthropist
John R. Donnell Jr.
Radka Donnell (1928–2013), Bulgarian feminist
Richard Spaight Donnell (1820–1867), Congressional Representative from North Carolina
Ricky Donnell Ross or Ricky Ross (drug trafficker) (born 1960), American convicted drug trafficker
Rory Ó Donnell, 1st Earl of Tyrconnell or Rory O'Donnell, 1st Earl of Tyrconnell (1575–1608), the last King of Tír Chonaill

Given name 

Donnell Bennett (born 1972), former American football fullback
Donnell Cameron, record producer
Donnell Deeny, QC, Chancery Judge in the High Court of Northern Ireland
Donnell Gilliam (1889–1960), United States federal judge
Donnell Harvey (born 1980), American professional basketball player
Donnell Holmes (born 1973), professional heavyweight boxer
Donnell II O'Donovan or Donal II O'Donovan, Lord of Clancahill (died 1639), son of Donal of the Skins, The O'Donovan of Clann Cathail
Donnell III O'Donovan or Donal III O'Donovan, The O'Donovan of Clancahill, born before 1584, son of Donal II O'Donovan, The O'Donovan of Clancahill
Donnell Irrais (fl. 1272–1274), Gaelic-Irish lord, member of the Clan Muircheartaigh Uí Conchobhair
Donnell Jones or Donell Jones (born 1973), American R&B singer, songwriter and record producer
Donnell Mor Mideach Ua Conchobair (fl. 1144–1176), Prince of Connacht
Donnell Ó Con Ceanainn, (died 1316), King of Uí Díarmata
Donnell of the Hides or Domhnall na g-Croiceann or Hides, The O'Donovan Mor, Lord of Clancahill from c. 1560 to 1584
Donnell Rawlings (born 1970), American comedian and actor
Donnell Smith, former defensive end in the National Football League
Donnell Thompson (born 1958), defensive end in the National Football League
Donnell Washington (born 1981), American football defensive tackle
Donnell Woolford (born 1966), former professional American football cornerback

See also
Donnell, Missouri, a community in the United States
Donnell Library Center, branch of the New York City Library
Guzmania donnellsmithii, species of the genus Guzmania
Harry E. Donnell House, historic 33-room Tudor mansion on the north shore of Long Island, New York
Mac Donnell Douglas or McDonnell Douglas, major American aerospace manufacturer and defense contractor
Pisonia donnellsmithii, species of plant in the family Nyctaginaceae
USS Donnell (DE-56), Buckley-class destroyer escort of the United States Navy
Donell
Dunnell (disambiguation)